The 2002–03 CEV Champions League was the 44th edition of the highest level European volleyball club competition organised by the European Volleyball Confederation.

League round

Pool A

|}

Pool B

|}

Pool C

|}

Pool D

|}

Pool E

|}

4th Finals

|}

First leg

|}

Second leg

|}

Final Four
 Place:  Milan
All times are Central European Time (UTC+01:00).

Semifinals

|}

3rd place match

|}

Final

|}

Final standings

External links
 2002/03 European Champions League

CEV Champions League
2002 in volleyball
2003 in volleyball